Payami may refer to:

Babak Payami, Iranian film director
Ali Payami, Swedish-Iranian music producer